The 45th edition of the annual Hypo-Meeting took place on May 25 and May 26, 2019 in Götzis, Vorarlberg (Austria). The track and field competition, featuring a men's decathlon and a women's heptathlon event is part of the 2019 IAAF Combined Events Challenge.

On the first day, Damian Warner succeeded in finishing the 100 metres in 10.12 seconds, setting a new world record for this discipline in the decathlon.

Men's decathlon

Schedule 

May 25

May 26

Records

Results

Women's heptathlon

Schedule 

May 25

May 26

Records

Results

See also 

 Hypo-Meeting
 Götzis
 Vorarlberg
 Decathlon

References 

 Results

External links
Home page

Hypo-Meeting
Hypo-Meeting
Hypo-Meeting
Hypo-Meeting